The steamboat Acme operated on Lake Washington and also on the Sammamish Slough to Bothell, Washington from 1899 to 1910, when it was destroyed by fire.

Construction and design
Acme was built in Seattle in 1899  on the Lake Washington shore.  The builders were Gustavus V. Johnson (1845-1926) & Son.
Gustavus V. Johnson was a Civil War veteran, who had been born in Clayton County, New York, and who had established a boat-building business on Lake Minnetonka in Minnesota.  He and his son Mark ran one of the earliest boatyards on Lake Washington (established 1888).   In addition to Acme, they built vessels such as L.T. Haas and City of Renton.

The overall size of the vessel was 31 gross and 21 registered tons. The official U.S. registry number was 107460. Acme has been described as a tug.

Operation
Acme was operated between Leschi and Madison parks and Bothell, Washington by N.C. Peterson. The vessel was used to service Leschi and Madison parks for one year, and thereafter being sold to the Bothell Transportation Company for use on the Bothell run. Acme was also under the ownership of John L. Anderson, one of the most important figures in steamboat navigation on Lake Washington.

Loss by fire
On August 16, 1910, at about 2:00 a.m., Acme burned on Lake Washington.  No one was on board at the time.  Due to the lack of evidence, an investigation could not determine the cause of the fire.  The total loss was $2,000.

Possible discovery of wreck
The vessel contained a small steam engine and a propeller shaft, which made the wreck unique. Normally machinery would have been salvaged from a vessel if possible.

See also
Steamboats of Lake Washington
Puget Sound Mosquito Fleet

Notes

References
 Kline, Mary S., and Bayless, G.A., Ferryboats -- A Legend on Puget Sound, Bayless Books, Seattle, WA 1983 
 Newell, Gordon R. ed., H.W. McCurdy Marine History of the Pacific Northwest,  Superior Publishing, Seattle WA (1966)
 Newell, Gordon R., Ships of the Inland Sea -- The Story of the Puget Sound Steamboats, Binford & Mort (2d Ed. 1960)

Steamboats of Washington (state)
Steamboats of Lake Washington
Propeller-driven steamboats of Washington (state)